was a Japanese football player. He played for Japan national team.

National team career
In May 1934, when Misaki was a Kwansei Gakuin University student, he was selected Japan national team for 1934 Far Eastern Championship Games in Manila. At this competition, on May 13, he debuted against Dutch East Indies. He also played against Philippines and Republic of China. He played 3 games for Japan in 1934.

National team statistics

References

External links
 
 Japan National Football Team Database

Year of birth missing
Year of death missing
Kwansei Gakuin University alumni
Japanese footballers
Japan international footballers
Association football midfielders